Pili may refer to:

Common names of plants 
 Canarium ovatum, a Philippine tree that is a source of the pili nut
 Heteropogon contortus, a Hawaiian grass used to thatch structures

Places 
 Pili, Camarines Sur, is a municipality in the Philippines
 Pili, barangay in Danao, Cebu
 Pili Volcano in Chile also known as Acamarachi

Other 
 Pili, another name for jianzi 
 Pili (film), nominated for the BAFTA Award for Outstanding Debut by a British Writer, Director or Producer in 2018
Pili line — a Hawaiian royal house
Pilikaaiea — a Hawaiian ruler 
Pili (TV series), a puppet show from Taiwan
 Pilus (plural pili) is a cellular organelle